The Dark Redemption is a 1999 Australian Star Wars fanfilm featuring Mara Jade, a character featured in Star Wars books and comics. Peter Sumner returns to the role of Imperial Officer Lt. Pol Treidum, whom he played in Star Wars.

An attempt was made to submit the film to an official fan film contest in 2003 that was sanctioned by George Lucas; however, the short was not considered to be eligible as it was set prior to the events of Episode IV: A New Hope, which violated the contest's rules by adding new content to the series, which Lucas also considered to be a copyright violation. The film was briefly removed from the Internet at Lucas' request.

Synopsis 
Set just before the events of Star Wars Episode IV: A New Hope, the film tells of how Mara Jade (a character from the Star Wars expanded universe) worked with other Rebels to capture the plans for the first Death Star. While on the mission, though, Mara hears the Emperor's call to turn to the dark side of the Force.

Other crucial moments in Star Wars history are explained in this film, such as how Han Solo got in trouble with Jabba the Hutt.

Cast 
 Damian Rice ... Zev Senesca
 Jason Chong ... Klaus Vanderon
 Michelle Ellard ... Hah'Shyyk Baba
 Martin Grelis ... Boba Fett
 Leah McLeod ... Mara Jade
 Peter Sumner ... Lieutenant Pol Treidum
 David Wheeler ... Garrock
 Drew Sneddon ... Darth Sidious
 William Bowden ... Voice of Darth Sidious and Cantina Alien
 Nathan Harvey ... Kyle Katarn
 Uncredited voice actor ... Han Solo
 Ben Craig ... Darth Vader
 Alan Cinis ... General Towa and Voice of Darth Vader
 John Griffiths ... Admiral Melaan
 Robert McDougal ... Captain McDougal and Imperial Officer
 Andrew Gibson ... Rebel Officer
 Maynard ... Lieutenant Arras
 Jake Downs ... Lieutenant Drovas
 David Lucas ... Lieutenant Raltar
 Will Usic ... Lieutenant Valle
 David Edwards ... Lieutenant Tighe
 Yul Kannan ... Zelig, Kessel Slave Miner, and voice of Cantina Alien
 Tabitha ... Bitha Tah'
 Jabba ... Ramsa Lenam
 Daniel Budd ... Royal Guard, Stormtrooper, and Imperial Officer

Production
Warren Duxbury and Dwight Boniecki worked on a script for The Dark Redemption for eight months before approaching Mether to help them make the film.  It was considered an ambitious fanfilm at the time, with 72 scenes and 20 CGI sequences.  A team of 20 3D artists worked on the short.  At the time of filming, Mether was a director-producer at Foxtel, and many Foxtel presenters acted in the film.

Reception
The film was screened twice at the Noosa Film Festival.

References

External links 
 
 The Dark Redemption at TheForce.net

1999 films
1999 independent films
Fan films based on Star Wars
1990s English-language films
1990s American films